Susan RoAne (ca. 1945) is an American author and speaker. She has written several business networking self-help books including How to Work a Room.

Background
RoAne was born Susan Rosenberg in Chicago and graduated from Mather High School in 1963. She has a bachelor's degree from the University of Illinois at Urbana–Champaign (1967) and a master's degree from San Francisco State University.

RoAne has been published or quoted in newspapers and periodicals such as Men's Fitness, Success, Harper's, Inc., Today, Men's Health, USA Today, Times of India,  Fresno Bee, CNN, San Francisco Chronicle, Business Insider, Cosmo, The Orlando Sentinel, CNBC, MarketWatch,<ref>[http://www.marketwatch.com/story/5-phone-calls-you-still-need-to-make-2013-11-21 5 phone calls you still need to make"] CNBC. Retrieved December 30, 2014.</ref> Tech Crunch,  Huffington Post, Entrepreneur,"Maximizing Your Time While Helping Others" Entrepreneur. Retrieved December 30, 2014. People magazine, Wall Street Journal,"Holidays at the Office" Wall Street Journal. Retrieved December 30, 2014. Forbes,"The Best Ways To Work A Room For Job Hunting" Forbes. Retrieved July 14, 2014. and The Guardian.

RoAne's books include How to Work a Room (1988), a self-help guidebook on how to socialize at parties and other events, oriented towards the business community.David Brooks. "How-To Books for Sharks and Dogs". Wall Street Journal (November 8, 1988). Abstract: Book reviews of Susan RoAne's "How to Work a Room: A Guide to Successfully Managing the Mingling" and Job Michael Evans's "The Evans Guide for Civilized City Canines" (Database: ProQuest) The 25th Anniversary edition,"5 Tips for Impressing Everyone You Meet" Women's Health. Retrieved February 28, 2014. How To Work a Room: The Ultimate Guide to Making Lasting Connections In Person and Online'', was published in 2013 by William Morrow Paperbacks. The book has sold over a million copies, was number one on Book-of-the-Month Club's list of best-selling nonfiction books in 1990 and has been published internationally.

As a keynote speaker, RoAne has spoken to Fortune 20–500 companies, conventions and presented at universities including University of Chicago, Yale University, NYU, Wharton School of Business, UC Berkeley, UCLA and Stanford University.

She has tied the formalization of rules for social networking to the women's movement, explaining that as women moved into the workforce, in particular beginning in the 1970s, they brought domestic networking skills re-applied to the business environment. For example, in 1988, RoAne described a "Scarlett O'Hara Syndrome" prevalent in women aged over 40 who do not initiate conversations because, as Scarlet said, "We haven't been properly introduced." Also in 1988, RoAne said, "I think women are afraid sometimes of being construed as being too forward".

In 2015, she was named as one of the 25 Professional Networking Experts to Watch in 2015.

Bibliography

References

External links
 

1945 births
Living people
American women writers
American businesspeople
Mather High School alumni
University of Illinois Urbana-Champaign alumni
21st-century American women